Undorosaurus is an extinct genus of ophthalmosaurid ichthyosaur known from western Russia, Svalbard, and Poland.

Discovery and naming
Undorosaurus was named by Vladimir M. Efimov in 1999 and the type species is Undorosaurus gorodischensis. The specific name is named after Gorodische, the type locality of this taxon. U. trautscholdi is named in honor of the geologist H. Trautschold who collected and made the first description of the fossils of the holotype of the species.

Undorosaurus was first known from the holotype UPM EP-II-20 (527), a partial three-dimensionally preserved skeleton which preserved partial skull. It was collected near the Volga river at Gorodische from the Epivirgatites nikitini ammonoid zone, dating to the Late Jurassic. A second species, U. trautscholdi was described by M.S. Arkhangelsky and N.G. Zverkov in 2014 from a partial left forefin found in the locality of Mnevniki, in the Moscow Oblast.

Classification
Maisch and Matzke (2000) regarded Undorosaurus to be a species of Ophthalmosaurus. However, Storrs et al. 2000 rejected this synonymy based on the tooth morphology of the specimen. Chris McGowan and Ryosuke Motani (2003) pointed out two noteworthy differences to Ophthalmosaurus, an incompletely fused ischiopubis and a remarkably strong dentition, and considered Undorosaurus to be a valid genus of ophthalmosaurid. Undorosaurus'''s validity is now accepted by most authors, even by Maisch (2010) who originally proposed the synonymy.

Zverkov & Efimov (2019) considered the genus Cryopterygius to be a junior synonym of the genus Undorosaurus. The authors considered the type species of the former genus, C. kristiansenae, to be synonymous with Undorosaurus gorodischensis; second species of Cryopterygius, C. kielanae, was tentatively maintained by the authors as a distinct species within the genus Undorosaurus.

Phylogeny
The following cladogram shows a possible phylogenetic position of Undorosaurus'' in Ophthalmosauridae according to the analysis performed by Zverkov and Jacobs (2020).

See also

 List of ichthyosaurs
 Timeline of ichthyosaur research

References

Extinct animals of Russia
Late Jurassic ichthyosaurs
Fossil taxa described in 1999
Ophthalmosaurinae
Ichthyosauromorph genera